Malian coup d'état may refer to:

2021 Malian coup d'état
2020 Malian coup d'état
2012 Malian coup d'état
1991 Malian coup d'état
1968 Malian coup d'état